Bassam Bashir Ibrahim (born 1960) is a Syrian engineer and politician. He has been Higher Education Minister since 2018.

Education 
He graduated from Moscow State University of Civil Engineering and the University of Aleppo.

Career
Held a number of administrative positions such as Deputy Dean of Civil Engineering Faculty in al-Baath University, Dean of Civil Engineering Faculty (1999-2005) and Rector of al-Baath University since 2017.

References 

Living people
1960 births
21st-century Syrian politicians
Syrian engineers
University of Aleppo alumni
Syrian ministers higher of education